The Provincial Bank of Canada (French: Banque provinciale du Canada) was a Quebec-based bank in Canada that was the product of mergers between the Banque Jacques-Cartier (1861), the Banque d'économie de Québec (1848), the Banque populaire de Québec (1868), and the Unity Bank of Canada (1972).

It merged with the Banque Canadienne Nationale to form the National Bank of Canada in 1979.

See also
 List of banks in Canada

References

Defunct banks of Canada
Banks disestablished in 1979
1861 establishments in Quebec
1979 disestablishments in Quebec
National Bank of Canada
Canadian companies established in 1861
Banks established in 1861
Canadian companies disestablished in 1979